Clay Hine (born 1963) is a barbershop musician and arranger.

He is a native Chicagoan, but has lived in the Atlanta Metro area since the late-80's since he graduated from the University of Illinois (Urbana-Champaign) in 1986 with a degree in electrical engineering.  Before college he sang with The West Towns Chorus (Lombard, Illinois) winning 2 silver medals (1985, 1986).  He started arranging when he was a teenager for fun, mostly tags and parts of songs.  After college he began arranging for a newly chartered chorus in Marietta, Georgia (The Big Chicken Chorus) and his first post-college quartet Atlanta Forum (1987 Dixie District Champs).  His early arrangements were for the purpose of helping out Atlanta-area and Dixie District quartets and choruses, but he soon had requests nationwide from internationally competing choruses and quartets.  Clay has arranged music for: Keepsake, PLATINUM, FRED, Four Voices, Riptide, Backbeat, Marquis, Nightlife, BSQ, Max Q, Bank Street, State Line Grocery, Overture, Sound Standard, Svelte Brothers, and many other internationally renowned groups.

Although Clay had many years of piano as a child he is a self-taught arranger having little formal music education at the university level.  Clay directed the Big Chicken Chorus from 1989 through 2004 and began directing the newly chartered Atlanta Metro (Atlanta Vocal Project) chapter in 2005. In his 20 years of directing Clay has won 16 international chorus preliminary contests with the Big Chicken Chorus (1989–2004) and 6 with The Atlanta Vocal Project (2005–2008, 2011–2012).  He has arranged over 300 songs in various styles although most of those songs are in the barbershop style. He also spent 8 years as a Music judge for the Barbershop Harmony Society.

In 1999 Clay's quartet, FRED, won the international quartet competition in Anaheim, California.  He continues to be active with FRED, the Atlanta Vocal Project, and his current quartet Category 4 (previously A Mighty Wind) and still arranges music for various groups. A Mighty Wind was featured on the video game BioShock Infinite, performing a barbershop version of "God Only Knows".

Clay is married to Becki Hine. They have two children, Melody and Camden.

References

External links 
 Barbershop Harmony Society website
 Clay's arrangements website
 Atlanta Vocal Project website
 Big Chicken Chorus website

Living people
1963 births
Grainger College of Engineering alumni